Weather Girls is a group of Japanese idols from Taiwan. Originally, the group is formed in 2010 and acted as weather forecasters on television and the internet for Taiwan and the United States. After attracting attention in Japan, seven of its members, one for each day of the week, are selected to debut as an idol group in Japan in 2012. They are the first Taiwanese girl group to come to Japan.

In Japan, the group is under Pony Canyon and is managed by Ritz Productions. Jeff Miyahara is the producer of the group. After its debut, the group had continuously performed in all regions of the country. Its members had also starred in dramas, hosted television shows, and sung television theme songs. The group had released six Japanese singles, one Japanese album, and other work.

In 2013, the group also debuted as a musical group in Taiwan. The group issued a Mandarin album in the following year. In its homeland, the group is under FEMC and is managed by L Motion Entertainment. Its producer is Bryan Chen (陳國華).

History

2010–12: weathercasters

Desiring to produce a daily program featuring charming Taiwanese girls, Next TV Broadcasting Limited originated an idea of creating a daily weather forecast program to be distributed through television and the internet, with a group of cute young girls doing cosplay and dancing whilst reporting forecasts.

On 1 August 2010, Next TV formed a group of seven girls called "Weather Girls". The number of the members is later increased to fourteen and eventually thirty-four. The duties of the girls were to report weather forecasts or, in fact, to "keep eyes glued on TV sets", but not to serve as meteorologists. Each day of the week is hosted by a different girl who would introduce herself, dance in costume and deliver a short message to viewers in an adorable manner during the report.

The program theme is changed every month. For example, in the graduation theme, the weather reports were filmed at Shih Chien University and the girls dressed up in Japanese school uniforms and spoke in Japanese. The themes of Chinese New Year, company internship, environmentalism, flight attendants, ninja, and tokusatsu had also been used. Furthermore, the costumes, music, and visuals were changed in each theme.

As the forecasts were for Taiwan and the United States, the girls spoke in English, Mandarin and Japanese. Lester Shih (奚岳隆), creator of the program, said the Japanese versions were not originally intended for Japanese audience, but merely an expression of Japanese style of cuteness. On television, the forecasts were broadcast daily during the afternoon, evening, and late news.

Regarding the idea of producing the program, Shih said:

Sunday Girl NueNue, one of the members later selected to form an idol group in Japan, stated: "We all learn about it a bit in school [...], though I still don't know too much about weather forecasting." According to her, the idea of Next TV was to "make weather fun" since "weather reports are usually dull because it's just someone telling you that it's going to be sunny or it's going to rain, etc."

The program became highly popular, especially in Japan where it was introduced by many Japanese programs in April 2012. The program was terminated and the group was dissolved after some of its members became an idol group in Japan.

2012: debut as idol group in Japan

Debut in Japan

After having appeared on Japanese programs in April 2012, the group attracted much attention in Japan. Seven of its members, most skilled in singing and dancing, were then chosen to debut in Japan as an idol group which is also titled "Weather Girls". They are the first Taiwanese girl group to come to Japan.

On 8 August 2012, the news of Weather Girls debut was officially announced. In Japan, the group was under Pony Canyon and was represented by Ritz Productions. Jeff Miyahara was the producer of the group. At a press conference, a Pony Canyon representative said:

Friday Girl Mini stated: "I have been fond of Japan since my childhood days and I have been wishing I could live there someday. I have also been longing to become a singer. Being able to fulfill these dreams of mine is such a wonderful feeling." Saturday Girl Yumi, leader of the group, added that she and her fellow members wished to appear on the annual music show Kōhaku Uta Gassen (紅白歌合戦) and to become weather forecasters in Japan as well.

On 10 August 2012, the group held its debut performance at the A-Nation festival.

For their Japanese career, the seven girls were required to take Japanese courses, in addition to dance lessons and performance rehearsals. Their language studies were broadcast on television once a week. Since 23 September 2012, they had also been fixed guests on the show @TV Akihabara (@TV秋葉原) which aired every Sunday and aimed to educate viewers on different forms of Japanese culture.

First single, "Koi no Tenki Yohō"

In September 2012, the first single of the group, "Koi no Tenki Yohō", was announced. On 30 September 2012, the music video of the title track was officially released. The music video published on YouTube had attracted more than one million views.

On 17 October 2012, the single was physically released in two editions, regular and limited. The CDs in both editions contain the title track, and a B-side, "Loving Pass – Koi no Password", as well as the instrumental versions thereof. The limited edition was also accompanied by a special DVD containing the music video and a video of the girls introducing themselves.

2013: first Japanese album and debut in Taiwan

In 2013, Weather Girls saw additional developments in Japan. The group released three singles and one full-length album. The group also enjoyed opportunities to regularly appear on television, as it launched its first television show and first television drama. In addition, the girls decided to take a tough national examination to become licensed weather forecasters in Japan and took the whole year to prepare themselves for it. At the end of the year, the group also debuted in its homeland Taiwan and Wednesday Girl Dara had her own contract terminated, thereby leaving the group.

Second and third singles, "Koi wa Tokimeki Chūihō" and "Koi no Love – Sunshine"

On 25 December 2012, the second single of the group, "Koi wa Tokimeki Chūihō", was announced. On 6 February 2013, it was physically released. On 31 January 2013, the music video of the title track was released.

On 5 June 2013, the group's third single, "Koi no Love – Sunshine", was released . On 25 April 2013, the music video of the title track was released. The sailor swimsuits, the concept costumes for this single, were designed by Junko Isogai (磯谷淳子) from the fashion house Dexi.

Weathercaster licence exam

On 17 May 2013, it was revealed that the group would take Japan's National Weather Forecasting Licence Examination to become legitimate weather forecasters in the country, in addition to its idol career. The examination has been held biannually since 1994, reportedly with a five percent pass rate.

For the sake of the examination, the group took meteorological classes where a licensed weather forecaster gave lectures and fans were allowed to be present. These classes were called Absolutely Pass! (絶対合格！). On 25 January 2014, the group took the examination. On 9 May 2014, the last class took place at Pony Canyon Headquarters in Tokyo.

First Japanese album, Weather Girls

On 17 May 2013, the first album of the group, called Weather Girls, was announced. On 3 July 2013, it was physically issued. The eponymous album contains six new songs and four hit songs from the previous singles. The songs vary from dance-pop to ballad.

With the theme of clouds, the concept art of the album was described as follows: "Weather Girls, wearing fluffy marshmallow clouds, come to Japan riding on 'bomb anticyclone'". The cloud outfits, the concept costumes for this album, were again designed by Junko Isogai from the fashion house Dexi.

From its debut to the end of July 2013, the group had made a total of one hundred and one public performances. On 11 August 2013, the group performed at the A-Nation festival once again.

Fourth single, "Hey Boy – Weishenme?", as well as first TV show and drama

On 19 August 2013, it was announced that the fourth single of the group, titled "Hey Boy – Weishenme?", would be released in autumn 2013.The release date was later announced to be 20 November 2013.

The title track served as the ending theme of Attack Shimasukedo Nani Ka?, a new television show hosted by the group. On 19 October 2013, several networks began airing the show.

On 6 September 2013, Secret Chores Group, a thirty-one-episode series produced by Next TV started to be broadcast in Japan. Set in 2030, the sci-fi dramedy was about a group of six girls charged with secret investigative missions, played by the members of the group, save Thursday Girl Mia.

Debut in Taiwan and retirement of Wednesday Girl

On 1 October 2013, Wednesday Girl Dara vacated her membership. On 15 October 2013, the group's management agency, Ritz Productions, released a statement that her contract was terminated due to her repeated abandonment of work, despite its successive warnings and encouragement.

On 7 October 2013, it was announced that the group also debuted as a musical group in its homeland Taiwan. On the same day, the group made its presence in Taipei where it held a debut performance, a press conference, and a contract signing ceremony. In Taiwan, the group is under FEMC.

On 5 November 2013, the group issued its first Mandarin song called "Wei Wo Jiayou" which served as the official theme song for the Super Basketball League (SBL) tenth season. On the same occasion, it was announced that the group would be the official spokesperson of the SBL during its eleventh season. On 7 November 2013, the music video of "Wei Wo Jiayou" was released.

2014: first Mandarin album

In 2014, the group obtained a new Wednesday Girl, Ria, before releasing two singles and appearing in a television drama in Japan. It also released its first Mandarin album in its homeland and continued to work in both countries. In addition, its members were appointed anti-piracy ambassadors by a Japanese copyright protection organisation. Late this year, Tuesday Girl Ice left the group.

New Wednesday Girl and fifth single, "Tomorrow World"

On 24 January 2014, a Taiwanese girl nicknamed Ria was selected to replace Dara as Wednesday Girl. At the same time, it was announced that the fifth single of the group, "Tomorrow World", would be released on 5 March 2014. Roles of Ria commenced from this single.

The title track, "Tomorrow World", is deemed a new aspect of the group, as it was the group's first medium tempo song. Besides, its lyrics are about graduation season after which a new world of graduates begins, and convey the significance of friendship, whilst most of the group's earlier released songs concern natural seasons and romantic love.

On 17 February 2014, the music video of "Tomorrow World" was premiered. It was shot on the rooftop of a five-hundred-metre-tall building in Taipei with certain landmark buildings in the background, including Taipei 101 and Taipei City Hall.

Anti-piracy ambassadors and video game characters

On 27 January 2014, the Content Overseas Distribution Association, a Japanese private organisation supported by the Japanese and Taiwanese governments and having the objective to promote copyright protection at regional level in Asia, appointed the members of the group as Japanese–Taiwanese Goodwill Ambassadors to promote anti-piracy campaigns in both countries. On 22 February 2014, the inauguration was held at the art museum Spot Hushan in Huashan 1914 Creative Park, Taipei, where the girls were given the titles "Japanese–Taiwanese Copyright Protection Commanders" (日台著作権保護隊長).

On 28 January 2014, International Games System released a dance video game, We Dancing Online 3, featuring the group members as new characters, as well as its hit song "Koi no Tenki Yohō". The game also includes the costumes and scenes appearing in the music videos of the group.

Further entertainment shows

On 4 April 2014, the group became regular cast on Kosaka Daimaō No Idol Club, a radio show hosted by comedian Daimaou Kosaka and broadcast every Friday by Nippon Broadcasting System.

On 7 April 2014, Nagoya Broadcasting Network started broadcasting Tetsuko no Sodatekata, a television drama in which the group appeared as a group of railway idols called "Railway Girls" (鉄道ガールズ). Directed by Tomoyuki Furumaya, the drama was adapted from the 2014 seinen manga of the same name written by Hiroshi Kawasumi.

On 25 April 2014, Gala Television began airing in Taiwan every Friday We Are Coming, a comedy show directed by George Chang (張兆志) and starring the group. Despite having gained very high ratings, it was announced on 4 July 2014 that the show would be terminated at the end of July 2014. The announcement came immediately after the concurrent resignation of some of the crew and cast members, including Producer Sun Lexin (孫樂欣) and Actor Tai Chih-yuan.

On 1 October 2014, the group launched a one-hour internet show called Let's Go Live. The show was live broadcast every Wednesday night on its official channel at Livehouse.in. During the show, viewers could participate in the chat room discussions on the channel and could phone in. The group later issued more internet shows on the same website: Ustyle × Tianqi Nuhai Tebie Qihua broadcast every Thursday night from 20 November 2014 and  Ptt Zhoubao × Tianqi Nuhai broadcast every Monday night from 12 January 2015.

Sixth single, "Like You – Anyway"

On 7 April 2014, the sixth single of the group, "Like You – Anyway", was announced. On 4 June 2014, the single was physically released. The title track was used as the ending theme of the previously mentioned drama Tetsuko no Sodatekata. Premiered on 1 May 2014, the music video of "Like You – Anyway" was shot at a Pony Canyon studio in Chigasaki, Kanagawa. The theme of the single is summer vacation. Instead of matching uniforms as in the preceding singles, the concept outfits for this single are casual summer dresses consisting of white tops and colourful shorts and skirts.

On 3 June 2014, the group celebrated its sixth single by holding an activity in which its members one by one published one hundred articles on their Ameba blog within one day. As they succeeded in their activity, these girls became the first Taiwanese artists carrying out such activity and the first Taiwanese people succeeding therein.

First Mandarin album, Wei A, and retirement of Tuesday Girl

On 10 February 2014, it was reported that the group was to release a Mandarin album in Taiwan.

On 4 July 2014, the group premiered a Mandarin song called "Wo Shi Boss" at Taoyuan International Baseball Stadium where Brother Elephants and Lamigo Monkeys launched their baseball match series called Bao Wen Pa (豹紋趴) and the group members served as the ceremonial first pitchers. The song is the theme song for CSTV's Boss Sports Channel (博斯運動頻道).

On 1 October 2014, Tuesday Girl Esse declared on her Facebook fanpage that she vacated her membership on 23 September 2014 for personal reasons.

On 25 October 2014, there was an announcement that Wei A, the first Mandarin album of the group, would be released in Taiwan on 1 November 2014. The album contains ten songs: two previously released songs and eight newly composed songs.The production of the album was the collaboration between many famous Taiwanese musicians, including Bryan Chen (陳國華), Cai Zhengxun (蔡政勳), Chase Chang (張傑), Jacky Chen (陳建瑋), Jiujiu (九九), Lu Weixiao (魯維孝), Tina Wang (王雅君), and Yu Xuan (于萱).

On 27 October 2014, several songs from the album were premiered on radio. On the release date, the group held an autograph session marking the launching of the album at Ximending, Taipei. Within a few days after its release, the album became the fourth-best-selling album in the country.It was ranked the third-best seller at the end of November 2014.

On 8 November 2014, the music video of the title song, "Wei A", was premiered. On 2 December 2014, the music video of another song from the album, "Don't Cry", was issued.

2015: Mini's injury

In 2015, the group continued to carry out activities in its homeland, Taiwan. On 24 January 2015, it performed at the annual grand event Super Star (超級巨星紅白藝能大賞), the Taiwanese version of Kōhaku Uta Gassen. The event took place at Taipei Arena and was broadcast on 18 February 2015, the eve of the Chinese New Year.

On 18 February 2015, The Wonderful Wedding, a Taiwanese film starring the group, was also released.

On 2 June 2015, Friday Girl Mini informed on her Facebook that she has an injury on her backbone. She then asked the Taiwanese company, FEMC, for a long break to receive proper physical therapy treatment. However, the date of Mini's return is still an unknown.

2016: new TV program and Daikin CF
On 7 January 2016, a new travel TV program called, HI! LET'S GO (嗨!LET'S GO), hosted by Weather Girls, is aired on Asia Travel(亞洲旅遊台). In March 2016, Weather Girls endorsed Daikin air conditioner. The company partnered up with the group by giving them a new identity called, "DKR32", as well as released a special MV to promote the new Daikin air conditioner.

Mia departure and disbandment announcement
In October 2016, Mia announced that she would leave Weather Girls. WGSx7 was released as the last public event in October, and Weather Girls will continue to participate with a new member. The newly joined Korean member Sindy officially unveiled at the public event on May 11, 2017. However, on November 1, 2017, Shiquan Entertainment cancelled the contract with Weather Girls for commercial reasons and disbanded the group.

Controversy

Due to success of Weather Girls, the Mainland China Guangdong Television set up a group of weather reporting girls called "Pinkopie" (蘋果派 Píngguǒ Pài; "Apple Pie") to produce a like program in December 2011. In January 2012, Next TV responded to the Chinese group with a press release describing the program as "plagiarism" and condemning the Chinese authority for its lack of copyright protection laws.

Members

Timeline

Discography

Japanese singles

Japanese album

Mandarin Album

Other songs

Videography

Video collections

Video games

 2014: We Dancing Online 3 (唯舞獨尊3 Wéi Wǔ Dú Zūn 3)

Music videos

Music video appearances

Filmography

Films

Short films

Television dramas

Internet dramas

Television/Internet show hosts

Variety shows appearances

Internet shows
Regular

Internet shows appearances

Radio shows
Regular

Radio shows appearances

References

Further reading

External links

 Japanese
 Official blog
 Official channel on YouTube

 Taiwanese
 
 Official channel on YouTube

 Others
 
 

2010 establishments in Taiwan
Cosplayers
Japanese girl groups
Japanese idol groups
Pony Canyon artists
Taiwanese girl groups